Bảo Lâm may refer to several places in Vietnam, including.

 Bảo Lâm District, Cao Bằng Province
 Bảo Lâm District, Lâm Đồng Province
 Bảo Lâm, Lạng Sơn, a commune of Cao Lộc District